Janusz Marek Wójcik (November 18, 1953 – November 20, 2017) was a Polish politician, football player and coach.

Playing career
He played in several clubs at home and abroad, including Agrykola, Gwardia, Ursus and Hutnik Warszawa, Ravalpandi (Pakistan) and the Toronto Falcons (Canada).

Coaching career
Wójcik also trained several Polish clubs like Hutnik Kraków, Jagiellonia Białystok, Legia Warszawa, Pogoń Szczecin and Lukullus Świt Nowy Dwór Mazowiecki as well as the Polish Olympic team which won the silver medal in the 1992 Summer Olympics, Polish national senior football team, and the U-18 and U-16 national teams of Poland.

He worked as a manager also out of his country like Al-Khallej, Anorthosis Famagusta and Syria national team.

On 21 April 2008 he was appointed Widzew Lodz manager.

In 2010 Wójcik was hired as manager for Omani club, Al-Nahda.

Political career
He was a member of the Self-Defense of the Republic of Poland party and was elected to Sejm (the lower chamber of the Polish parliament) on 25 September 2005 getting 4236 votes in 24 Białystok district.

Personal life
He graduated from the Warsaw Academy of Physical Education in 1979. After suffering an epileptic attack that lead to a severe head injury, he died on 20 November 2017 in hospital after surgery, without waking up from a pharmacological coma. On 29 November 2017, after the funeral mass in the Warsaw church of St. Dominik, was buried in the Służew New Cemetery.

References

External links
 Janusz Marek Wójcik – parliamentary page – includes declarations of interest, voting record, and transcripts of speeches.

1953 births
2017 deaths
Politicians from Warsaw
Footballers from Warsaw
Polish footballers
Polish expatriate footballers
Polish football managers
Members of the Polish Sejm 2005–2007
Self-Defence of the Republic of Poland politicians
Polish expatriate football managers
Poland national football team managers
Syria national football team managers
Expatriate football managers in Cyprus
Anorthosis Famagusta F.C. managers
Legia Warsaw managers
Śląsk Wrocław managers
Jagiellonia Białystok managers
Widzew Łódź managers
Canadian National Soccer League players
Toronto Falcons players
Association football defenders
Hutnik Warsaw managers
Polish sportsperson-politicians
Gwardia Warsaw players
Hutnik Warsaw players
Expatriate soccer players in Canada
Polish expatriate sportspeople in Canada